The 1968 United States Senate election in Indiana took place on November 5, 1968. Incumbent Democratic U.S. Senator Birch Bayh was re-elected to a second consecutive term in office, defeating Republican State Representative William Ruckelshaus.

General election

Candidates
Birch Bayh, incumbent U.S. Senator since 1963
Ralph Lee (Socialist Workers)
L. Earl Malcom (Prohibition)
William Ruckelshaus, State Representative from Indianapolis

Results

See also 
 1968 United States Senate elections

References

1968
Indiana
United States Senate